Konstadinos Stefanopoulos (born July 11, 1984 in Veroia) is a Greek race walker. He is a four-time national champion for the 50 km race walk.

Stefanopoulos represented Greece at the 2008 Summer Olympics in Beijing, where he competed for the men's 50 km race walk. He finished the race in thirty-seventh place by quarter of a minute (25 seconds) ahead of Canadian racewalker Tim Berrett, with a time of 4:07:53.

References

External links

NBC 2008 Olympics profile

Greek male racewalkers
Living people
Olympic athletes of Greece
Athletes (track and field) at the 2008 Summer Olympics
1984 births
Sportspeople from Veria